The Edward Medal was a British civilian decoration which was instituted by royal warrant on 13 July 1907 to recognise acts of bravery of miners and quarrymen in endangering their lives to rescue their fellow workers. The medal was named in honour of King Edward VII. The original royal warrant was amended by a further royal warrant on 1 December 1909 to encompass acts of bravery by all industrial workers in factory accidents and disasters, creating two versions of the Edward Medal: Mines and Industry.

In both cases (Mines and Industry), the medal was divided in two grades: first class (silver) and second class (bronze), with the medal being a circular silver or bronze medal (as appropriate to the class awarded) suspended from a ribbon 1 3/8" wide and coloured dark blue and edged with yellow. The medal associated with mines depicted colliers at work whilst the industry medal had a female figure with an industrial complex in the background.  Peculiarly, the cost of the Edward Medal (Mines) was borne by a fund established by a group of philanthropists (including prominent mine owners) and not the state.

The Edward Medal (Mines) was awarded only 395 times (77 silver and 318 bronze) and the Edward Medal (Industry) only 188 times (25 silver and 163 bronze, of which only two were awarded to women), making the Edward Medal one of the rarest British gallantry awards.  Only posthumous awards were made after 1949, and the Edward Medal (Industry) (1st class) was not awarded after 1948.

The Edward Medal was discontinued in 1971, when surviving recipients of the Edward Medal (along with holders of the Albert Medal) were invited to exchange their award for the George Cross.  Nine (2 silver, 7 bronze) elected not to exchange their medals.

References

External links

UK National Archives - Civilian Gallantry Medals
Edward Medal Royal Warrant
Australian Honours Website
Albert Medal and Edward Medal
George Cross Database (including list of those who exchanged the Edward Medal for the George Cross)
List of Edward Medal recipients (Mines)

Civil awards and decorations of the United Kingdom
Awards established in 1907
 
1907 establishments in the United Kingdom
Mining in the United Kingdom
Awards disestablished in 1971
1971 disestablishments in the United Kingdom